Guillaume N'Kendo Tchougang (born 6 January 1986) is a former Cameroonian football striker. He had notably played in Turkey and Slovakia.

References

External links
FK DAC profile

1986 births
Living people
Expatriate footballers in Angola
Cameroonian expatriate sportspeople in Angola
Cameroonian footballers
Expatriate footballers in Iran
Cameroonian expatriate sportspeople in Iran
Estrela Clube Primeiro de Maio players
Paykan F.C. players
Albacete Balompié players
Expatriate footballers in Turkey
Cameroonian expatriate sportspeople in Turkey
Cameroonian expatriate footballers
UD Alzira footballers
FC DAC 1904 Dunajská Streda players
Slovak Super Liga players
Expatriate footballers in Slovakia
Cameroonian expatriate sportspeople in Slovakia
Expatriate footballers in Spain
Cameroonian expatriate sportspeople in Spain
Association football forwards